WTJT (90.1 FM) is a radio station broadcasting a Christian radio format. Licensed to Baker, Florida, United States, the station serves the Ft. Walton Beach area. The station is currently owned by Robert John Williamson, through licensee Florala Radio Group.

The morning Gospel Cruise with Scott Dennis began on April 11, 2011.  Weekdays from 6 a.m.- 10 a.m.

References

External links
 Official Website
 

TJT
Moody Radio affiliate stations
Radio stations established in 1948
1948 establishments in Florida